This list of the works of William Crooke (1848–1923) represents much of his literary output in pursuit of his interests in ethnology and folklore, for which he was far many years considered to be a leading authority.

In addition to the items listed below in respect of Folk-Lore Record and its successor, Folk-Lore, the journal of the Folklore Society, Crooke also contributed frequently to that journal in the form of letters and brief observations. He was editor of the journal from 1915 until his death.

In addition to these works, Crooke made many contributions to the Encyclopedia of Religion and Ethics.

He had been editing the Katha Sagara Kosa, as translated by Charles Henry Tawney, at the time of his death.

Books — authored

Books — edited

Books — other
 - tales collected by Crooke, retold by Rouse

Journals — articles

Journals — reviews

References

Crooke, William
Ethnology
Folklore